Penguin Bloom is a 2020 Australian drama film directed by Glendyn Ivin, from a screenplay by Shaun Grant and Harry Cripps, and is based on the book of the same name by Cameron Bloom and Bradley Trevor Greive. It stars Naomi Watts, Andrew Lincoln and Jacki Weaver. The book and film are based on a true story of Sam and Cameron Bloom's family and their interactions with an Australian magpie named 'Penguin'.

It was theatrically released in Australia by Roadshow Films on 21 January 2021 and digitally in the United States by Netflix on 27 January.

Plot
During a family vacation in Thailand, Sam Bloom (Naomi Watts) accidentally falls off a high balcony and breaks her T6 thoracic vertebrae resulting in partial paralysis. Back home in Australia, Sam, an avid surfer, struggles to adjust to life in a wheelchair, but is supported by her husband Cameron (Andrew Lincoln), their three sons Noah, Rueben and Oli, and Sam's overbearing mother Jan (Jacki Weaver).

One afternoon, the three boys find and bring home an injured magpie chick who they name Penguin. Sam is initially despondent to care for Penguin but understands it is important to Noah, and as time goes on, she bonds with her. Noah feels guilty for being the one who asked his mum to go up to the balcony in Thailand and has withdrawn from her since the accident. Sam and Cameron's relationship also deteriorates as she struggles to find joy in daily life and wishes to forget who she was before the fall since she can no longer live in the same way. She demands he never asks her how she is.

After several weeks, Penguin fully recovers and learns to fly, inspiring Sam to want to do something for herself; she starts kayaking lessons. For Sam's birthday, the Blooms go for dinner at Jan's house, joined by Sam's sister Kylie (Leeanna Walsman) and Sam's kayaking instructor Gaye (Rachel House). While Jan and Cameron argue about Sam's new life and their responsibilities to her, Penguin is attacked by two larger birds and then flies away.

Sam eventually confronts Noah about his guilt and tells him he is not to blame for what happened to her. She apologises for being distant and reveals she has found her strength, and the whole family reconcile. Sam asks Cameron to ask her how she is, and when he does, she replies, "I'm better."

Penguin returns home a few days later, and Sam thanks her for helping her recover.

Cast
 Naomi Watts as Sam Bloom, Cameron's wife and Jan's daughter.
 Andrew Lincoln as Cameron Bloom, Sam's husband
 Griffin Murray-Johnston as Noah Bloom
 Felix Cameron as Rueben Bloom
 Abe Clifford-Barr as Oli Bloom
 Jacki Weaver as Jan, Sam's mother
 Rachel House as Gaye
 Leeanna Walsman as Kylie
 Lisa Hensley as Bron

Production
The rights to the book were acquired in December 2016 by Bruna Papandrea. Naomi Watts was set to star, and will produce alongside Mark Audet and Emma Cooper, and Made Up Stories. In June 2017, Shaun Grant was hired to write the screenplay. By February 2019, Glendyn Ivin was set to direct, and in July Andrew Lincoln, Jacki Weaver and Rachel House were added to the cast.

Filming began in Australia in early August 2019.

Release
Penguin Bloom had its world premiere at the Toronto International Film Festival on 12 September 2020.

The film was released theatrically in Australia on 21 January 2021 by Roadshow Films, and hit number one at the Australian box office for its opening weekend.

Netflix released the film in North America, the United Kingdom, Ireland, South Africa,  France and select Asian countries on 27 January 2021.

Reception
The website's critical consensus reads: "Penguin Blooms fact-based story could have been adapted with greater nuance, but strong work from Naomi Watts and Andrew Lincoln adds some much-needed heart." According to Metacritic, which sampled 17 critics and calculated a weighted average score of 54 out of 100, the film received "mixed or average reviews".

The script for Penguin Bloom by Shaun Grant and Harry Cripps was shortlisted for the Betty Roland Prize for Scriptwriting at the 2021 New South Wales Premier's Literary Awards.

Accolades

References

External links
 
 

2020 films
2020 drama films
American drama films
Australian drama films
Films scored by Marcelo Zarvos
Films shot in Australia
2020s English-language films
Screen Australia films
Roadshow Entertainment films
2020s American films